Schizothecium vesticola is a species of coprophilous fungus in the family Lasiosphaeriaceae. In Greece, it is known to grow in the dung of goats and possibly on that of sheep, goats and donkeys. In Iceland, it has been reported from the dung of sheep, goose and horse.

References

External links

Fungi described in 1972
Fungi of Greece
Fungi of Iceland
Sordariales